Hamala is a village located in the Kingdom of Bahrain, an island country in the Persian Gulf.

Batelco, Bahrain's largest telecommunications company, has its HQ based in Hamala.

References 

Populated places in the Northern Governorate, Bahrain
Populated coastal places in Bahrain

fr:Hamala